Anaganaga O Kurraadu is a 2003 Indian Telugu-language romantic drama film directed by L P Ramarao and starring Rohit and Rekha. The film reuses scenes from Bend It Like Beckham (2002).

Cast 

Rohit as Sachin
Rekha as Rekha
Banerjee as Vithal Rao
Rajeev Kanakala as Rajeev
Vizag Prasad as G. K. Naidu
Devadas Kanakala as Rajeev's father
Chalapati Rao as Driver
Dharmavarapu Subrahmanyam
Gundu Hanumantha Rao
Sangeetha
M. Balayya
Kadambari Kiran
Venkatapathy Raju as a selection committee member (special appearance)

Production  
Director LP Rama Rao previously worked under Puri Jagannadh. Most of the film completed shooting by the end of 2002 sans three songs, which were to be shot in Malaysia and Singapore.

Reception 
Gudipoodi Srihari of The Hindu opined that "The narration becomes interesting only when it is deals with cricket". A critic from Sify wrote that "The film is made against the cricket background but comes a cropper as director Rama Rao fails to keep the tempo going". Jeevi of Idlebrain.com stated that "But the director failed to cash on the cricketing scenes in this film though the entire film revolves around cricket".

References

External links 

2000s Telugu-language films
2003 films
Films scored by Chakri